Onega may refer to:

Places

Russia
Onega (river), in Arkhangelsk Oblast
Onega, Russia, a town in Arkhangelsk Oblast
Onega Bay (Onega Gulf)
Onega Peninsula
Lake Onega

United States
Onega, Minnesota, United States
Onega, Texas (now called Aubrey), United States

People
Ermindo Onega (1940–1979), Argentine footballer
Daniel Onega (born 1945), Argentine footballer

Ships
, a Russian factory ship in service 1945-69

Other
Onega stepanovi, an Ediacaran fossil genus renamed Cephalonega in 2019
Onega (leafhopper), a genus of leafhoppers

Onega rocket, a proposed further upgrade version of the Soyuz-2 launch vehicle

See also
Onezhsky (disambiguation)
Omega (disambiguation)